Byron Wallen (born July 1969) is a British jazz trumpeter, composer and educator. He was described by Jazzwise as "one of the most innovative, exciting and original trumpet players alive". As characterised by All About Jazz, "He does not fit into any pigeonhole, however, and is also something of a renaissance man: he has long been involved in cognitive psychology and also travels widely, spending extended periods in South Africa, Uganda, Zimbabwe, Nigeria, Morocco, Indonesia and Belize (his parents' homeland)."

Biography
Wallen was born in London, England, to parents from Belize, and was brought up in a musical family – one of his three siblings is composer Errollyn Wallen. After beginning to learn classical piano as a young child, also playing euphonium, he went on to study the trumpet in New York in the mid- to late 1980s with Jimmy Owens, Donald Byrd and Jon Faddis. Wallen graduated from Sussex University with a degree in Psychology, Philosophy and Maths, while developing his music career, recording with Loose Ends and Cleveland Watkiss, and playing trumpet with The Style Council, Charles Earland, Courtney Pine and Jean Toussaint, among others. He is also among the alumni of jazz music education and artist development organisation Tomorrow's Warriors. Other artists with whom he would later perform include David Murray, Andrew Hill, Butch Morris, Billy Higgins, Hugh Masekela, Manu Dibango, Eddie Henderson, Wynton Marsalis, George Benson, William Orbit, Toumani Diabate, Ronnie Laws, Chaka Khan and Grand Union Orchestra.

Forming his own band Sound Advice in 1992, Wallen released his debut album in 1995, which has been followed by five further albums.

As a composer Wallen has had commissions from such organisations as London's Science Museum, the BBC, Jerwood Foundation, Southbank Centre, National Theatre, Arts Council England, FIFA and Sage Gateshead.

In 2018, Wallen joined the staff of Trinity Laban Conservatoire of Music and Dance.

Awards and recognition
In 2003, Wallen received a BBC Jazz Award in the Jazz Innovation category.

His 2007 album Meeting Ground was nominated for Best Band and Best Album in the 2007 BBC Jazz Awards and Best Jazz Act in the 2007 MOBO Awards.

In 2017, Wallen received a Paul Hamlyn Award.

Discography
 1995: Sound Advice
 1997: Bambaraka - Automatic Original
 1997: Earth Roots
 2002: Indigo
 2007: Meeting Ground
 2020: Portrait: Reflections On Belonging

References

External links
 Official website
 Le Gendre, Kevin, "A Meeting Of Minds", Echoes, 2007.
 

Living people
1969 births
English people of Belizean descent
Black British musicians
English jazz trumpeters
British male jazz musicians
21st-century English composers
21st-century British male musicians
21st-century jazz composers
FMR Records artists